Acute Rehabilitation Unit, is a hospital ward designated for physical medicine and rehabilitation.

References 

Rehabilitation medicine